Dam Rubah or Dom-e Rubah may refer to:
 Dom-e Rubah, Razavi Khorasan
 Dam Rubah, South Khorasan